Singing the Blues (also Singin' the Blues) is a 1956 song written by  Melvin Endsley and recorded by Marty Robbins.

Films
Singin' the Blues (1948), an animated sing-along film that is part of Sing and Be Happy (series)

Music

Albums
Singin' the Blues (B.B. King album)
Singin' the Blues (Jimmy Witherspoon album) 1958
Singing the Blues (Brook Benton album) 1962
Singing the Blues (Connee Boswell album)

Songs
Singin' the Blues (1920 song), composition by Robinson, Conrad, Lewis, and Young, lyrics added by Aileen Stanley 1920